Cristian Tello Herrera (born 11 August 1991) is a Spanish professional footballer who plays as a forward or winger for Saudi Professional League club Al Fateh.

He spent his youth at Espanyol and Barcelona, playing for both clubs' reserves before breaking through into the first team of the latter. He also spent one and a half seasons in Portugal with Porto and as many in Italy with Fiorentina. He returned Spain with Betis in 2017, where he made 172 total appearances and scored 24 goals, winning the Copa del Rey in 2022.

Tello represented Spain at the 2012 Olympics, and was part of the under-21 squad which won the European Championship in 2013. He won his only full cap in 2013.

Club career

Espanyol
Born in Sabadell, Barcelona, Catalonia, Tello started playing at the age of eight with CFU Can Rull, moving to FC Barcelona shortly after and being loaned to another club in the region, CF Damm, for one year.

In 2008, his contract expired and RCD Espanyol signed him. He made his senior debut in the 2009–10 season, playing four games with the B team and being relegated from the Segunda División B.

Barcelona
In June 2010, Tello moved back to FC Barcelona Atlètic, who competed in the Segunda División. On 9 November 2011 he made his debut for Barças main squad, playing the full 90 minutes in a 1–0 away win against CE L'Hospitalet in the round of 32 of the Copa del Rey; he scored a brace in the second leg, a 9–0 demolition.

Tello made his first La Liga appearance on 28 January 2012, coming on as a substitute for Adriano in the 75th minute of a 0–0 draw at Villarreal CF. The following weekend, in his first league start, he opened the score in the eighth minute of a 2–1 home victory over Real Sociedad after a through ball by Lionel Messi.

On 7 March 2012, Tello replaced Andrés Iniesta early into the second half of a match against Bayer 04 Leverkusen at the Camp Nou, taking his bow in the UEFA Champions League: he scored his first goal within two minutes, after Cesc Fàbregas played him through over the top and he ran from the halfway line to net from just inside the penalty area for the 4–0; six minutes later, from a similar position, he made it 6–0 for the hosts in an eventual 7–1 win (10–2 on aggregate).

Even though his future initially seemed uncertain, Tello managed to convince new manager Tito Vilanova and stayed in roster for the 2012–13 campaign, inclusively going on to start in several games. On 19 September 2012 he scored the opener and assisted Messi in the second goal, in a 3–2 home defeat of FC Spartak Moscow in the Champions League group stage, where he was also chosen as Player of the match.

On 13 December 2012, Tello signed a new contract with Barcelona, keeping him with the Blaugrana until June 2016. Nine days later, he scored after only 30 seconds on the pitch in the last play of the 3–1 away win over Real Valladolid.

Tello fell further down the offensive pecking order in 2013–14, following the arrival of Neymar. He scored his first goal of the season on 11 December in a 6–1 home rout of Celtic in the Champions League group phase, and six days later he also found the net, in a 3–0 victory against FC Cartagena in the domestic cup (7–1 on aggregate). In the quarter-finals of the latter competition, away to Levante UD, he profited from three Messi assists to score his first hat-trick as a professional as his team won 4–1.

Tello was loaned to FC Porto of the Primeira Liga on 16 July 2014, in a two-year deal. He scored his first goal for the club on 25 November, entering as a substitute for Ricardo Quaresma and concluding a 3–0 win at FC BATE Borisov in the group stage of the Champions League. Five days later, he netted his first league goal, the opener in a 5–0 home win over Rio Ave FC. On 1 March 2015, he scored all of his side's goals as they beat Sporting CP 3–0.

On 22 January 2016, Barcelona and ACF Fiorentina reached an agreement for the loan of Tello until 30 June 2016. He made his Serie A debut on 3 February, starting a 2–1 defeat of Carpi F.C. 1909 at the Stadio Artemio Franchi, and scored his first goal 18 days later in a 3–2 victory at Atalanta BC.

On 16 August 2016, the loan was renewed for the upcoming season.

Betis
On 30 June 2017, Tello joined Real Betis on a five-year deal for €4 million. He made his debut from the bench on 25 August in a 2–1 home win over RC Celta de Vigo,  and scored his first goal on 15 October as a consolation in a 6–3 loss to Valencia CF also at the Estadio Benito Villamarín. On 30 November, he netted twice in a 5–3 defeat (6–5 aggregate) to fellow Andalusians Cádiz CF in the last 32 of the domestic cup.  

Tello scored four league goals in each of his first two seasons. In 2019–20 he rarely started under manager Rubi and was linked to January moves to Espanyol or Celta; he stayed and scored the late winner against Real Madrid on 8 March.

Tello scored five goals in 2020–21. On 22 May 2021, as the campaign ended with qualification for the UEFA Europa League via a 3–2 comeback win at Celta, he came on as a half-time substitute and received the first sending-off of his career for two yellow cards in as many minutes.

Tello contributed six appearances and one goal as his side won the 2021–22 Spanish Cup. This included nine minutes of the final against Valencia CF.

Los Angeles FC
Tello signed a three-year deal with Los Angeles FC on 26 August 2022, with his $1.78 million salary being one of the highest in Major League Soccer. He made his debut on 13 September as a substitute in a 1–1 draw at Minnesota United FC, as his team ended the season with the Supporters' Shield. In the championship game, he came on in extra time as LAFC defeated the Philadelphia Union in a penalty shootout for their first MLS Cup; he took and missed the first attempt.

Al Fateh
On 25 January 2023, Tello joined Saudi Arabian club Al Fateh SC on an 18-month contract.

International career

Tello was a member of the Spanish squad that participated in the 2012 Summer Olympics in London, playing all three games in an eventual group stage exit. He made his only appearance with the full side on 14 August 2013, starting in a 2–0 friendly win in Ecuador.

Tello also represented the unofficial Catalonia team, making his debut on 2 January 2013 in a 1–1 draw with Nigeria.

Career statistics
Club

HonoursBarcelonaLa Liga: 2012–13
Copa del Rey: 2011–12
Supercopa de España: 2013BetisCopa del Rey: 2021–22Los Angeles FCMLS Cup: 2022
Supporters' Shield: 2022Spain U21UEFA European Under-21 Championship: 2013Individual'
SJPF Player of the Month: March 2015

References

External links

1991 births
Living people
Sportspeople from Sabadell
Spanish footballers
Footballers from Catalonia
Association football wingers
Association football forwards
La Liga players
Segunda División players
Segunda División B players
CF Damm players
RCD Espanyol B footballers
FC Barcelona Atlètic players
FC Barcelona players
Real Betis players
Primeira Liga players
FC Porto players
Serie A players
ACF Fiorentina players
Major League Soccer players
Los Angeles FC players
Saudi Professional League players
Al-Fateh SC players
Spain youth international footballers
Spain under-21 international footballers
Spain under-23 international footballers
Spain international footballers
Olympic footballers of Spain
Footballers at the 2012 Summer Olympics
Catalonia international footballers
Spanish expatriate footballers
Expatriate footballers in Portugal
Expatriate footballers in Italy
Expatriate soccer players in the United States
Expatriate footballers in Saudi Arabia
Spanish expatriate sportspeople in Portugal
Spanish expatriate sportspeople in Italy
Spanish expatriate sportspeople in the United States
Spanish expatriate sportspeople in Saudi Arabia